Roland Clark is an American house music DJ, producer, songwriter and vocalist.

Biography
In the past, Roland Clark used the aliases Jesus Jackson, Digital Pimps, Dark Clark, South Street Player, and is also founding member of the dance music project Urban Soul. He learned how to write songs from his childhood mentor Calvin Gaines.

In 1999, he released his first single "I Get Deep".

One of the many projects he has been involved in is "Flowerz" by Armand van Helden, from the album 2 Future 4 U from 1998, as well as delivering his writing and vocal talents to the likes of Todd Terry, Duke Dumont and Katy Perry.

He was featured on two Fatboy Slim songs, "Star 69" and "Song for Shelter", both of which sample part of Clark's song "I Get Deep" and feature on Fatboy Slim's 2000 album Halfway Between the Gutter and the Stars.

In 2017, "I Get Deep" was once again sampled in "Swish Swish" by Katy Perry.

His 2006 song "Running on Sunshine", which he performed using the Jesus Jackson alias and co-recorded with Fatboy Slim, has appeared in various ABC programming such as Grey's Anatomy and Men in Trees.

Clark is currently a resident of Atlanta, Georgia. Roland has since started a record label Delete Records, which is distributed by Label Worx Distribution.

References

Further reading
 Roland Clark interview by Pete Lewis, 'Blues & Soul' August 2008
 Black History Month: Roland Clark - Beatport News (7 February 2011)
 Exclusive Dj Roland Clark Interview. SoundCloud. Retrieved 3 June 2014
 {https://www.beatportal.com/news/playlist-of-the-week-roland-clark
 {https://www.beatportal.com/features/artist-of-the-month-roland-clark
 {https://www.beatportal.com/news/vintage-culture-fancy-inc-roland-clark-unite-on-free
 {https://findyoursounds.com/david-guetta-morten-and-roland-clark-explore-the-depths-of-future-rave-with-new-single-alive-again
 {https://technomood.org/interview-with-roland-clark
 {https://www.15questions.net/interview/fifteen-questions-interview-roland-clark/page-1
 {http://www.bluesandsoul.com/feature/310/roland_clark_mixing_with_the_stars
 {https://www.theplayground.co.uk/exclusive-interview-five-minutes-with-roland-clark
 {https://soundcloud.com/djrolandclark/dj-roland-clark-interview

External links
 Roland Clark on Resident Advisor

Living people
1965 births
American DJs
Record producers from New York (state)
Record producers from New Jersey
American male songwriters
American house musicians
DJs from New York City
Musicians from New York (state)
Songwriters from New York (state)
Songwriters from New Jersey
House musicians
Electronic dance music DJs